Shiekh Ubaidullah (born c. 663 AD) was a Muslim Arab saint from Medina. He is thought to be a  relative of Abu Bakr from whom Ubaidullah learnt about Islam in an environment free from desire and greed of materialism for developing his moral and spiritual beliefs.

Early life 
The name Ubaidullah is an indirect Quranic name that means “little servant of Allah”. Ubaid is the diminutive form of the word Abd ("servant") and is formed from Ubaid (“little servant”) and Allah (“God”), -u- being the case marking for the nominative (in construct state).

Nothing is known about the early life of the saint except his lineage which is traced to Caliph Abu Bakr, the Ist rightly guided Caliph, of whom he is believed to be in some close relation.

Career 
By profession, the Saint is believed to be a merchant before undertaking the holy mission to preach Islam.

Tradition has it that Saint Ubaidullah, once praying in the Holy prophet's mosque in Medina fell asleep and saw a dream in which he saw Prophet Muhammad and was told by the Prophet to go to distant lands from the east of Jeddah to preach Islam to the people.

He interpreted the dream as a divine vision from Allah for his salvation and the people of those distant lands, so he proceeded to Jeddah where he travelled across the ocean for accomplishing his mission.

Preaching Islam in Lakshadweep India
On his journey his vessel capsized in a storm and he had to continue his journey by drifting on a plank till he reached Amini in AH 41 (663 AD). He started his act of preaching from Amini and was able to convert the Pondambelli family despite the initial linguistic challenges. After facing opposition there he left Amini with some of his new Muslim fellows and moved to Andrott where he got significantly high conversions. He then went to Kavaratti and Agatti, preaching there and then came back to Amini. This time unlike his first arrival in Amini, he was welcomed and  via his preaching could successfully influence and convert almost the whole of population to Islam. At last stage of his life, he travelled to Andrott where he lived the rest of his life preaching and teaching. Ubaidullah never went back to his home land of Hijaz and devoted his life for dawah. Sheikh Ubaidullah advanced Islam in Lakshadweep (now in India) Islands by delivering sermons before the islanders.

Death and legacy 
Apparently, the saint died at Andrott Island with his remains buried in Juma Mosque.

Juma Mosque, one of the top attractions in Lakshadweep is said to have been built during his time.

It is believed that 97% of the population in Lakshadweep being Muslim at present is a result of his preaching.

References

Muslim saints
600s births
Year of death unknown
Muslim missionaries